The second gentleman or  second lady of the United States (SGOTUS or SLOTUS respectively) is the informal title held by the spouse of the vice president of the United States, concurrent with the vice president's term of office. Coined in contrast to "first lady" – albeit used less commonly – the title "second lady" was apparently first used by Jennie Tuttle Hobart (wife of Garret Hobart, vice president 1897–1899) to refer to herself. Second gentleman of the United States is the title held by Doug Emhoff, the husband of Vice President Kamala Harris.

Twelve second ladies have gone on to become first ladies during their husbands' terms as president. The first to do this was Abigail Adams, who was married to John Adams, who was the first vice president from 1789 to 1797 and then the second president from 1797 to 1801. Thus, Abigail was the first second lady and the second first lady. The most recent to do this is Jill Biden, who is married to Joe Biden, the 47th vice president from 2009 to 2017 and then the 46th president since 2021.

The current second gentleman is Doug Emhoff, as his wife Kamala Harris became the 49th vice president of the United States on January 20, 2021. Emhoff is the first second gentleman of the United States.

History
The second spouse's visibility in the public sphere has been a somewhat recent development. Although the role of the first lady as White House hostess dates from the beginning of the republic (and was typically filled by another member of the president's family if the president was unmarried or a widower), with a few exceptions, it was generally not until the late 20th century and early 21st century that vice-presidential wives took on public roles that attracted significant media attention.

In one notable exception, Floride Calhoun, wife of Vice President John C. Calhoun, was a central figure in the Petticoat Affair, a social-political scandal which involved the social ostracism of Secretary of War John H. Eaton and his wife Margaret O'Neill Eaton, further damaging already-strained relations between Vice President Calhoun and President Andrew Jackson.

In 1978, Muriel Humphrey, wife of Vice President Hubert Humphrey, became the only former second lady to hold public office; after her husband, who had returned to the U.S. Senate after his term as vice president, died in office, she was appointed by Minnesota governor Rudy Perpich to continue her husband's term. 

There have been 17 periods of vacancy in the role, the longest of which continued for 16 years between the service of vice presidential spouses Abigail Adams and Ann Gerry when there were three widower vice presidents and a one-year vacancy in the vice presidency. The most recent second lady vacancy was for 132 days in 1974, between the service of Betty Ford and Happy Rockefeller, when the vice presidency was also vacant.

12 second ladies went on to become first lady following their husbands becoming president, the first being Abigail Adams and most recent being Jill Biden.

Role in practice 
The role of the second lady is unpaid and not formally defined. The wife of the vice president of the United States was traditionally expected to serve as a hostess and appear at society functions. Jennie Tuttle Hobart, wife of Vice President Garret Hobart (1897–1899) is often cited as the first woman to style herself as "Second Lady". Hobart took over the hostess duties on behalf of First Lady Ida Saxton McKinley, who had chronic health issues including epilepsy. Starting in 1917, the wife of the vice president took on the unofficial role of convener of the Red Cross Senate Wives, presiding over their lunches; the organization later became known as the Senate Spouses Club. The question of the second lady's status became a topic of debate in 1929 when Dolly Curtis Gann, the sister of Vice President Charles Curtis (1929–1933), assumed the role of hostess on his behalf, since he was widowed. Gann had waged a public "battle of precedence" against Alice Roosevelt Longworth, the wife of the late speaker of the House.

Over time, the spouse of the vice president started to become more visible as the Office of the Vice President itself gained power and influence, and assumed additional responsibilities. In 2010, Marie Claire magazine described the role of second ladies as being "relegated to roast-chicken charity dinners and sit-and-smile political functions. They cherry-pick a cause or two...and pretty much stay out of the way." Presidential historian Gil Troy noted that during the Kennedy Administration, one of Second Lady Lady Bird Johnson's roles was to replace First Lady Jacqueline Kennedy when she withdrew from public appearances, often at the last minute; Johnson replaced Kennedy on more than 50 occasions.

Pat Nixon, wife of Vice President Richard Nixon, was the first second spouse to add a great deal of substance to the role of the vice president's wife. When Nixon assumed the position in 1953, the role's only official function was to preside over the once-annual Senate Ladies Luncheon. Instead, Nixon launched her own initiatives, sensing great opportunities that her role provided. She established a schedule separate from that of her husband, which often consisted of solo activities. As second lady, Nixon traveled more than 125,000 miles around the world to six continents, including a two-month, 42,000-mile journey through Asia in 1953. As she undertook missions of goodwill across the world, she insisted on visiting schools, orphanages, hospitals and village markets rather than attend tea or coffee functions. In this sense, Nixon essentially created the modern role of the second lady; historian Kate Andersen Brower wrote, "she helped to define this nebulous role for an entire generation of women who would succeed her." Historian Cormac O'Brien says that Pat Nixon "may have well been the most extraordinary second lady in American history" because of her role in accompanying Vice President Richard Nixon on a tour of the world as a goodwill ambassador. She also traveled independently of the vice president and attended events, including campaign tours, on her own. According to O'Brien, Second Lady Nixon proved popular "as a paragon of graciousness, composure, and elegance", and made a conscious effort to travel to locations where local women were banned, to spread a subtle message for equal rights. 

During the Reagan Administration, Second Lady Barbara Bush hosted more than one thousand events and traveled over 1.5 million miles at home and abroad over eight years, and championed literacy, a cause she continued to support when she later became First Lady. 

Tipper Gore, former wife of Vice President Al Gore, was active in several campaigns to remove material she found objectionable from popular American entertainment like movies, television shows and music, starting when her husband was a senator. She challenged performers over their use of profane lyrics and often debated with her critics, such as Dead Kennedys singer Jello Biafra. Lynne Cheney, wife of Vice President Dick Cheney, championed education reform, citing specific failures of the American public education system during her tenure as second lady. She is a particularly outspoken supporter of American history education, having written five bestselling books on this topic for children and their families. Jill Biden, wife of President Joe Biden, worked as an English professor at Northern Virginia Community College, and is thought to be the first second lady to hold a paying job while her husband was vice president. She has been involved in various causes, including breast cancer awareness and literacy.

Causes and initiatives 

 Jill Biden; "Joining Forces"; military families
 Karen Pence: Art Therapy 
 Doug Emhoff; Judaism

List of second ladies and gentlemen of the United States

Other spouses of U.S. vice presidents
Various other spouses of vice presidents of the United States are not considered as second ladies of the United States because their marriages were not during the vice presidential terms of their husbands.

Nine U.S. vice presidents were widowed prior to their vice presidencies:
Thomas Jefferson was married to Martha Wayles from 1772 until her death in 1782.
Aaron Burr was married to Theodosia Bartow Prevost from 1782 until her death in 1794.
George Clinton was married to Sarah Tappen from 1770 until her death in 1800.
Martin Van Buren was married to Hannah Hoes from 1807 until her death in 1819.
Richard Mentor Johnson deemed the enslaved Julia Chinn to be his common-law wife until her death in 1830.
Henry Wilson was married to Harriet Howe from 1840 until her death in 1870.
William A. Wheeler was married to Mary King from 1845 until her death in 1876.
Chester A. Arthur was married to Ellen Lewis Herndon from 1859 until her death in 1880.
Charles Curtis was married to Annie Baird from 1884 until her death in 1924. Curtis's half-sister Dolly Gann acted as his official hostess for social events during his vice presidency.
Five U.S. vice presidents were widowed and remarried prior to their vice presidencies:
Hannibal Hamlin was married to Sarah Emery from 1833 until her death in 1855. He was subsequently married to Ellen Emery from 1856 to his death in 1891.
Schuyler Colfax was married to Evelyn Clark from 1844 until her death in 1863. He was subsequently married to Ellen Wade from 1868 to his death in 1885.
Levi P. Morton was married to Lucy Young Kimball from 1856 until her death in 1871. He was subsequently married to Anna Livingston Reade Street from 1873 to her death in 1918.
Theodore Roosevelt was married to Alice Hathaway Lee from 1880 until her death in 1884. He was subsequently married to Edith Carow from 1886 to his death in 1919.
Joe Biden was married to Neilia Hunter from 1966 until her death in 1972. He has subsequently been married to Jill Jacobs since 1977.

One U.S. vice president was divorced and remarried prior to his vice presidency:
Nelson Rockefeller was married to Mary Todhunter Clark from 1930 until 1962. He was subsequently married to Happy Fitler Murphy from 1963 until his death in 1979.

One U.S. vice president was widowed before his vice presidency and remarried during his vice presidency:
Alben W. Barkley was married to Dorothy Brower from 1903 until her death in 1947. He was subsequently married to Jane Rucker Hadley from 1949 to his death in 1956.

Three U.S. vice presidents remarried after their vice presidencies:
Aaron Burr was married to Elizabeth Bowen Jumel from 1833 until their divorce in 1836.
John Tyler was married to Julia Gardiner from 1844 until his death in 1862.
Millard Fillmore was married to Caroline Carmichael McIntosh from 1858 until his death in 1874.

See also
First Lady of the United States (list)
Vice President of the United States (list)
United States order of precedence

References

External links

United States, Second Lady or Gentleman
 Second Lady or Gentleman of the United States